The following is a list of securities examinations and the organizations that offer them.

Africa

The Securities Industry Training Institute East Africa (SITI) was conceptualized in 2008 to standardize and administer market education for the East African region.  It is a joint effort involving the region's Central Depository & Settlement Corporation Ltd (CDSC) and the following exchanges:
Uganda Securities Exchange Ltd (USE)
Kenya's Nairobi Securities Exchange Ltd (NSE)
Tanzania's Dar-es-Salaam Stock Exchange Ltd (DSE)
the Rwanda Stock Exchange.
Ethiopia Institute of Financial Studies (EIFS) training program
Ghana Stock Exchange (GSE) Securities Courses
Namibia Stock Exchange (NSX) semi-annual Stock-brokering Exams
Nigerian Stock Exchange (NSE) offers a few certificate programs including:
Module 1: The role and responsibilities of compliance officers in the capital market 
Module 2: Compliance risk based monitoring programmes
Module 3: Conduct of business obligations of a broker dealer firm 
Module 4: Anti-money laundering and terrorist financing
Module 5: Capital market operations
South Africa:
The South African Institute of Financial Markets (SAIFM) offers the specific technical exams required with regard to the "Regulated Positions" of trader, compliance officer, and settlement officer,  at the JSE Stock Exchange, JSE Debt Market, South African Futures Exchange, AltX, and STRATE. 
SAIFM also offers the "Registered Persons" examinations, required for licensing as financial market "practitioners" on the various exchanges; the typical roles here are investment advisor and fund manager. (Additional to these, it offers various specific training courses and workshops.) 
The South African Institute of Stockbrokers administers the six exams required to become a qualified stockbroker, so as to manage a member firm of the JSE; other requirements are 3 years' work experience, and specified education.

Asia Pacific (ASEAN Plus Three)

Indonesia

Indonesia Stock Exchange (IDX) Educational Programs
IDX Basic Education Program
IDX Intermediate Education Program
IDX Advance Education Program
The Indonesia Capital Market Institute (TICMI) / The Committee For Capital Market Professional Standards (PSPPM)
Wakil Perantara Pedagang Efek (WPPE) / Broker Dealer Representative
Wakil Manajer Investasi (WMI) / Investment Manager Representative
Wakil Penjamin Emisi Efek (WPEE) / Underwriter Representative
Ahli Syariah Pasar Modal (ASPM) / Shariah Capital Market Professional

Singapore

Singapore College of Insurance (SCI)

Malaysia

The Securities Commission of Malaysia (Suruhanjaya Sekuriti Malaysia) provides an overview of licensing/certification in the country for those who deal in securities, derivatives, financial planning, etc.

For actual exam detail, see SIDC

 Module 6: Stock Market and Securities Law
 Module 7: Financial Statement Analysis and Asset Valuation
 Module 9: Funds Management Regulation
 Module 10: Asset and Funds Management
 Module 11: Fundamentals of Compliance
 Module 12: Investment Management and Corporate Finance
 Module 14: Futures and Options
 Module 16: Rules and Regulations of Futures and Options
 Module 17: Securities and Derivatives Trading (Rules and Regulations)
 Module 18: Securities and Derivatives Trading (Products and Analysis)
 Module 19: Advisory Services (Rules and Regulations)
 Module 19A: Advisory Services (Rules and Regulations) - Part A
 Module 19B: Advisory Services (Rules and Regulations) - Part B

China

ATA

For Futures Practitioners:
China Futures Association
Futures Practitioner Exam
Futures Analyst Exam

Hong Kong, S.A.R.

The Hong Kong Securities and Investment Institute (HKSI)
Joint Programs with HKSI
Hong Kong Exchanges and Clearing Limited (HKEx)
The Chartered Institute for Securities & Investment (CISI)
The Hong Kong Polytechnic University 
The City University of Hong Kong

India

National Institute of Securities Markets
National Stock Exchange of India NCMP Certified Market Professional
Bombay Stock Exchange Training & Certification

Japan 

Core Knowledge Inc
Japanese Securities Dealers Association (JSDA)
FINRA Series 47

Philippines

Securities Representative Certification Exam (SRCE)
Associated Persons Certification Exam (APCE)
The Investment Company Representative Certification Program (ICRCP)

Thailand

Securities Analysts Association (SAA)

Cambodia

Financial Institute of Cambodia (FIC)

Global

ACI The Financial Markets Association, f.k.a. Association Cambiste Internationale, offers a full 'suite of examinations' including Dealing & Operations certificates, among others
CFA Institute
Securities & Investment Institute (SII) for Islamic/Syariah Finance
Thomson Reuters

The Middle East
The Israel Securities Authority requires six exams and an internship to become a portfolio manager: Exams: Securities Law and Ethics, Accounting, Statistics and Finance, Economics, Securities and Financial Instrument Analysis, Portfolio management.
Capital Market Authority (Saudi Arabia)
General Securities Qualification Examination (CME-1)
Compliance & Anti-money laundering/CTF (CME2)
Broker-Dealer Qualification Certificate (CME-3)
Various courses for The U.A.E. (Dubai, Abu Dhabi), Kuwait, Bahrain, Saudi Arabia

North America

Canada

Canadian Securities Institute (CSI) – variety of exams for certification.
IFSE Institute (IFSE) – variety of exams for certification.

United States

The following is a list of the U.S. Financial Industry Regulatory Authority (FINRA), NASAA, and National Futures Association (NFA) financial securities examinations.  Most FINRA examinations are divided into two categories: Registered Representative and Registered Principal levels. An asterisk designates that there is no sponsorship requirement in order take the exam.

Registered representative level

 SIE – Securities Industry Essentials Exam*
 Series 00 – General Securities Principal Exam (Discontinued)
 Series 1 – Registered Representative Exam (Discontinued)
 Series 2 – Non-Member General Securities Exam (Discontinued)
 Series 3 – National Commodities Futures Exam*
 Series 5 – Interest Rate Options Exams
 Series 6 – Investment Company and Variable Contracts Exam (Mutual Funds Broker/Variable Annuities) 
 Series 7 – General Securities Representative Exam (Stockbroker) 
 Series 11 – Assistant Representative – Order Processing
 Series 15 – Foreign Currency Options Exam
 Series 17 – United Kingdom Securities Representative Exam 
 Series 22 – Direct Participation (Limited partnerships) Exam 
 Series 30 – NFA Branch Manager Exam
 Series 31 – Futures – Managed Funds Exam*
 Series 32 – Limited Futures Exam - Regulations
 Series 37 – Canada Securities Representative Exam - With Options 
 Series 38 – Canada Securities Representative Exam - No Options 
 Series 42 – Registered Options Representative Exam
 Series 44 – NYSE Arca Options Market Maker Exam
 Series 47 – Japanese Module of the General Securities Exam
 Series 52 – Municipal Securities Representative Exam
 Series 55 – Equity Trader – Limited Representative Exam
 Series 56 – Proprietary Trader Qualification Exam 
 Series 57 – Securities Trader Qualification Exam
 Series 62 – Corporate Securities – Limited Representative Exam (Discontinued)
 Series 63 – Uniform Securities Agent State Law Exam*
 Series 65 – Uniform Investment Adviser Law Exam* 
 Series 66 – Uniform Combined State Law Exam (Combined 63 and 65)*
 Series 72 – Government Securities – Limited Representative
 Series 79 – Investment Banking Exam
 Series 82 – Private Securities Offerings – Limited Representative
 Series 86 – Research Analyst – Securities Analysis 
 Series 87 – Research Analyst – Regulations
 Series 99 – Operations Professional

Registered principal level

 Series 4 – Registered Options Principal Exam
 Series 8 – General Securities Sales Supervisor Exam – Options Module & General Module (Discontinued)
 Series 9 – General Securities Sales Supervisor Exam – Options
 Series 10 – General Securities Sales Supervisor Exam – General Module
 Series 12 – NYSE Branch Manager
 Series 14 – NYSE Compliance Officer
 Series 14A – NYSE DMM Compliance Official Examination
 Series 16 – NYSE Supervisory Analyst
 Series 23 – General Securities Principal (Upgrade from Series 9 and 10)
 Series 24 – General Securities Principal Exam
 Series 26 – Investment Company and Variable Contracts Products Principal Exam
 Series 27 – Financial and Operations Principal Exam
 Series 28 – Financial and Operations Principal Introducing Broker Exam 
 Series 39 – Direct Participation Programs Principal Exam
 Series 51 – Municipal Fund Securities Limited Principal
 Series 53 – Municipal Securities Principal Exam

Latin America

Brazil 
Issued by ANBIMA(Brazilian Association of Financial and Capital Markets):
CPA-10 (Securities Representative - for Retail Investors)
CPA-20 (Securities Representative - for Qualified Investors)
CEA (Retail Account Financial Advisor)
CGA (Professional Portfolio Management)
AAI (Autonomous Investment Agent)
Issued by APIMEC (Brazilian Association of Investment and Capital Markets Professionals):
CNPI (Fundamental Securities Research) [Required for all fundamental sell-side research analysts]
CNPI-T (Technical Securities Research) [Required for all technical sell-side research analysts]
CNPI-P (Fundamental and Technical Securities Research)

Costa Rica

Securities broker license
Operator and promoter in currency derivatives

Europe

Irish Stock Exchange Xetra Exam
Chartered Institute for Securities & Investment (CISI) (United Kingdom)
The Finnish Society of Financial Analysts
Courses & Seminars in English, offered by Oslo Stock Exchange
Courses & Seminars in Norwegian/Norsk, offered by Oslo Stock Exchange
SwedSec Licensiering AB, subsidiary of the Swedish Securities Dealers Association
The European Federation of Financial Analysts Societies

See also

 Registered Representative
 Registered Investment Advisor

References

External links
 SEC
 NYSE
 FINRA
 South African Institute of Financial Markets

United States securities law
Standardized tests
Professional certification in finance
Securities (finance)